The 2022 Rally Catalunya (also known as the RallyRACC Catalunya - Costa Daurada 2022) is a motor racing event for rally cars that is scheduled to be held over three days between 20 and 22 October 2022. It would mark the fifty-seventh running of the Rally de Catalunya. The event would be the final round of the 2022 European Rally Championship and its support categories.

Background

Entry list
A total of twenty-one crews would enter with European Rally championship eligibility.

Itinerary
All dates and times are CEST (UTC+2).

Report

ERC Rally2 (Kit)

Special stages

ERC-3 Rally3

Special stages

ERC-4 Rally4

Special stages

References

External links
  
 2022 Rally Catalunya at eWRC-results.com
 2022 Rally Catalunya at rally-maps.com 

2022 in Catalan sport
2022 in Spanish motorsport
October 2022 sports events in Spain
2022
2022 European Rally Championship season